Specialist-baiting or Spetseedstvo was a sociological phenomena in the Soviet Union in the 1920s and 1930s where proletarian and young party members attacked specialists and professionals, causing them to be politically purged from the workplace, and allowing young inexperienced and uneducated workers to take these work positions.

See also
Industrial Party Trial
Great Purge
New Economic Policy
First five-year plan
Second five-year plan

References

1930s in the Soviet Union
Economic history of the Soviet Union
Political repression in the Soviet Union